The East 21st Street Bridge is a  or  or  long cable-stayed bridge in Tacoma, Washington completed in January 1997. SR 509 ends at a single point urban interchange with Interstate 705 west of the bridge, built as part of the same $165.3 million WSDOT project that also funded the bridge's construction.

The architect for the bridge was Jim Merritt, a Tacoma architect.

It is sometimes called Foss Waterway Bridge, although the Murray Morgan Bridge also crosses Foss Waterway.

References

External links

Tacoma cable-stayed bridge, Bridgehunter

Bridges in Tacoma, Washington
Cable-stayed bridges in the United States
Bridges completed in 1997